James Shapiro may refer to:

 Jim Shapiro (attorney), American attorney
 Jim Shapiro (drummer) (born 1965), American rock musician
 James Shapiro (physician), British-born Canadian doctor who developed the Edmonton protocol
 James A. Shapiro (born 1943), American professor of biochemistry and molecular biology
 James S. Shapiro (born 1955), American professor of English and comparative literature, non-fiction author